Sultan is a 1999 Indian Telugu-language action film, produced by MRV Prasad and directed by Sarath. The film stars an ensemble cast of Nandamuri Balakrishna, Krishna, Krishnam Raju, Roja, Rachana and Deepti Bhatnagar, with music composed by Koti. The film was released on 27 May 1999. It was not successful at the box office.

Plot
The films begin with the CBCID department of India appointing a spirited officer Ashok for nabbing a hardcore notorious terrorist Sultan who always in hides his real identity. According to an intelligence report, Sultan is going to attack a Minister. So, Ashok plans a trap to snare him. Presently, Sultan lands in the guise of an old man and assassinates the minister. Ashok chases him, in combat Ashok gets hold of Sultan’s mask. However, Ashok succeeds in detecting his true shade. The next day the same person joins as a forest officer Prudhvi Raj he loves and knits a girl Renuka. Meanwhile, Ashok is busy tracing Sultan and spots Prudhvi with Renuka. All of a sudden, he grabs him and puts him under secret custody. Therefore, Renuka conducts a severe agitation that shakes the country. Hence, the Government allows the case to stout-hearted CBI officer Mustafa. The day he was put on the mission, Mustafa gets a rude shock in the form of a bomb from Sultan that he manages to escape. Shortly, Mustafa flies down to Hyderabad and strongly affirms to Ashok that Prudhvi & Sultan are two which he denies when a conflict arises.

After a while, Ashok & Mustafa discerns Prudhvi & Sultan are twins who split in childhood. Now they plan a strategy to nab Sultan via Prudhvi. Initially, Prudhvi shows the absence of consent but later accepts by getting knowledge of his country’s eminence. Once they start their mission Prudhvi explores Sultan’s girlfriend Vandana tracing her he successfully reaches Sultan’s house where he has his mother & wife Revathi. In no time Sultan senses something fishy and ruses the counter-attack in which Mustafa dies while guarding Prudhvi. In the interim, Sultan seizes Renuka on his island. However, Ashok & Prudhvi makes a breakthrough and steps therein. At that point, Ashok provides insight to Sultan that he is double-crossed by his men who are in the process of destruction of the entire country. At last, Sultan after soul-searching destroys the militant activities along with Ashok & Pruthvi. Finally, the movie ends with the Sultan sacrificing his life for the country.

Cast

Nandamuri Balakrishna as Sultan and Prudhvi (dual role)
Krishna as Ashok
Krishnam Raju as Mustafa
Roja as Revati
Rachana as Renuka
Deepti Bhatnagar as Vandana
Bramhanandam as Anji
Narra Venkateswara Rao as M. P. Mutyala Rao
Gokina Rama Rao as Minister Venkataratnam
Siva Krishna as Sultan's father
Mannava Balayya as Major Chakradhara Rao (Pruthvi's father)
Raghunatha Reddy as Minister
Ravi Babu as Noor
Jeeva as Police Inspector
Satya Prakash as Terrorist
Jakgad as Terrorist
Annapurna as Renuka's mother 
Sudha as Saraswathi (Pruthvi's mother)
Siva Parvathi as Sultan's mother
Bangalore Padma as Venkataratnam's wife

Soundtrack
Music composed by Koti. Music released on Supreme Music Company.

References

External links
 
Telugu News

1999 films
1990s Telugu-language films
Telugu films remade in other languages
Films about terrorism in India
Films set in Delhi
Films shot in Delhi
Indian action films
1990s masala films
Films directed by Sarath
Films with screenplays by the Paruchuri brothers
Films scored by Koti
1999 action films